This list is of the Cultural Properties of Japan designated in the category of  for the Prefecture of Fukui.

National Cultural Properties
As of 1 December 2014, three Important Cultural Properties have been designated, being of national significance.

Prefectural Cultural Properties
As of 1 December 2014, four properties have been designated at a prefectural level.

See also
 Cultural Properties of Japan
 List of National Treasures of Japan (historical materials)
 List of Historic Sites of Japan (Fukui)
 Wakasa Province
 Echizen Province
 List of Cultural Properties of Japan - paintings (Fukui)
 Fukui Prefectural Museum of Cultural History

References

External links
  Cultural Properties in Fukui Prefecture
  Historic Materials in Fukui Prefecture

Cultural Properties,historical materials
Historical materials,Fukui